Eero Gunnar Antero Hynninen (born April 19, 1953 in Pieksämäki) is a Finnish sprint canoer who competed in the mid-1970s. He was eliminated in the repechages of the K-4 1000 m event at the 1976 Summer Olympics in Montreal.

References
 Sports-Reference.com profile

1953 births
Living people
People from Pieksämäki
Canoeists at the 1976 Summer Olympics
Finnish male canoeists
Olympic canoeists of Finland
Sportspeople from South Savo